The 2023 FIBA AfroCan qualification are the qualifying games for the 2023 FIBA AfroCan, the second edition of the AfroCan. The qualifiers started in February and will finish in June 2023. Four teams are pre-qualified, while eight teams can qualify through the tournament.

The qualification is divided into zones.

Qualified teams

Games

Zone 6 
The games of Zone 6 of the AfroCan qualification began on 21 February 2023 and were hosted in Bulawayo, Zimbabwe. Malawi and South Africa were supposed to compete as well but  both teams withdrew.

One ticket to the AfroCan is available for Zone 6.

Group phase

Final

References 

AfroCan
2023 in African basketball